Paul Edwin "Herky" Hinrichs (born August 31, 1925) is a former relief pitcher in Major League Baseball who played briefly for the Boston Red Sox during the 1951 season. He was born in Marengo, Iowa. Listed at 6' 0", 180 lb., he batted and threw right-handed. In four appearances, Hinrichs posted a 21.60 ERA with one strikeout and four walks in 3⅓ innings of work, without recording a decision.

External links

Retrosheet

1925 births
Living people
Boston Red Sox players
Major League Baseball pitchers
Concordia Golden Bears baseball players
Baseball players from Iowa
People from Marengo, Iowa